The Cisco Kid is a 1950–1956 half-hour American Western television series starring Duncan Renaldo in the title role, the Cisco Kid, and Leo Carrillo as the jovial sidekick, Pancho. The series was syndicated to individual stations, and was popular with children. Cisco and Pancho were technically desperados wanted for unspecified crimes, but were viewed by the poor as Robin Hood figures who assisted the downtrodden when law enforcement officers proved corrupt or unwilling to help. It was also the first television series to be filmed in color, although few viewers saw it in color until the 1960s.

There were 156 half-hour episodes filmed between 1950 and 1956. The show was never run as a network series and was instead sold to local stations. During the series' initial run it was seen on 78 stations in the United States. In 1956 the series was dubbed into foreign languages and distributed to twenty countries, including France, Italy, Switzerland, Luxembourg, Belgium, Cuba, Puerto Rico, Argentina and the Dominican Republic.

Synopsis
The Cisco Kid was a charming ladies’ man, dressed in a highly embroidered black outfit, and his sidekick Pancho brought humor to the series with his heavily accented comments. Duncan Renaldo said of Leo Carrillo playing Pancho: “His accent was so exaggerated that when we finished a picture, no one in the cast or crew could talk normal English any more.”  The Cisco Kid rode a horse named Diablo, and Pancho rode Loco.

Cast
 Duncan Renaldo as the Cisco Kid
 Leo Carrillo as Pancho, Cisco's sidekick

Episodes

Production
There was little gunplay in the series. Cisco usually shot the gun out of the villain’s hand, and Pancho often disarmed the bad guys using a bullwhip. There was plenty of action in the series, and Renaldo often did his own stunts, which resulted in several injuries. In one episode Renaldo was to dodge a 65-pound papier-mâché boulder, which struck him in the head, breaking two neck vertebrae. He was paralyzed for two months.

Most of the series’ location work was done at Pioneertown, California.

References

External links 
 

First-run syndicated television programs in the United States
1950s Western (genre) television series
1950 American television series debuts
1956 American television series endings
Television series based on radio series
Television series by MGM Television
Television series by 20th Century Fox Television
English-language television shows
Adaptations of works by O. Henry
Cisco Kid
Television shows filmed in California